Yuriy Gladyr (born 8 July 1984) is a Ukrainian professional volleyball player with Polish citizenship (since 14 January 2013), a former member of the Ukraine national team. At the professional club level, he plays for Jastrzębski Węgiel.

Career

Clubs
Gladyr spent the 2008–09 PlusLiga season, playing in AZS Politechnika Warszawska. In 2009 he moved to ZAKSA Kędzierzyn-Koźle. In the 2010–11 PlusLiga season he achieved his first silver medal of the Polish Championship. On 12 March 2011 ZAKSA, including Gladyr, achieved a silver medal of the CEV Cup. In the 2011–12 PlusLiga season he gained a bronze medal after winning matches with Jastrzębski Węgiel. On 27 January 2013 he won the Polish Cup. In the 2012–13 PlusLiga season, Gladyr achieved his second silver medal of the Polish Championship, in the final his team lost to Asseco Resovia. On 16 March 2014 he won the Polish Cup with ZAKSA. In 2015 he extended his contract with the club. In 2016 he left ZAKSA and joined PGE Skra Bełchatów.

Honours

Clubs
 CEV Cup
  2010/2011 – with ZAKSA Kędzierzyn-Koźle

 National championships
 2005/2006  Ukrainian Championship, with Azot Cherkassy
 2007/2008  Ukrainian Championship, with Lokomotiv Kiev
 2012/2013  Polish Cup, with ZAKSA Kędzierzyn-Koźle
 2013/2014  Polish Cup, with ZAKSA Kędzierzyn-Koźle
 2015/2016  Polish Championship, with ZAKSA Kędzierzyn-Koźle
 2017/2018  Turkish Supercup, with Fenerbahçe İstanbul
 2020/2021  Polish Championship, with Jastrzębski Węgiel
 2021/2022  Polish SuperCup, with Jastrzębski Węgiel
 2022/2023  Polish SuperCup, with Jastrzębski Węgiel

Individual awards
 2011: Polish Cup – Best Blocker
 2021: Polish Championship – Best Server
 2022: Polish SuperCup – Most Valuable Player

References

External links

 
 Player profile at LegaVolley.it  
 Player profile at PlusLiga.pl  
 Player profile at Volleybox.net

1984 births
Living people
Sportspeople from Poltava
Ukrainian men's volleyball players
Ukrainian expatriate sportspeople in Poland
Expatriate volleyball players in Poland
Ukrainian expatriate sportspeople in Turkey
Expatriate volleyball players in Turkey
Ukrainian expatriate sportspeople in Italy
Expatriate volleyball players in Italy
Projekt Warsaw players
ZAKSA Kędzierzyn-Koźle players
Skra Bełchatów players
Fenerbahçe volleyballers
Jastrzębski Węgiel players
Middle blockers